Astro Ria is a 24-hour Southeast Asia Bahasa Malaysia television channel exclusive to the Astro satellite television provider. It was one of the first 22 channels to be launched on Astro in 1996. Astro Ria offers a variety of shows including news, local and Indonesian dramas, movies, reality shows, sports, talk shows, cartoons, concerts, sitcoms, documentaries, cooking shows, quizzes and more.

Channel changes were made from October 1, 2007, after Astro introduced a 3-digit channel. The channel is under the Astro Family package with other Malay channels like Astro Prima, Astro Oasis and channel Indonesian and Bahasa Malaysia, Astro Aruna.

In 2003, Astro Ria launched a show based from Mexican TV series La Academia, called Akademi Fantasia. The contest pits 12 singers in a bid to become the winner. The show became so popular in Malaysia and Brunei that spin-off versions were made in Indonesia and Thailand. A second season was made, which enabled Brunei viewers to vote as well. In its third season, 14 contestants instead of the original 12 were competing for the competition and the winner, Mawi became an instant music celebrity. A fourth season started in May 2006.

Astro Ria also hosts various prestigious annual events in the entertainment world such as the Era Awards broadcast, the Malaysian Film Festival, the Space Series Awards and also aired UMNO General Assembly live from the Putra World Trade Center (PWTC).

In May 2002, Astro Ria launched Bloomberg RIA News, which was essentially the Malay-language version of Bloomberg Malaysia. The news was aired at 10:45 pm on weekdays. Its first anchor was Amir Mahmood Razak, who eventually also presented for the English version. The show was produced by Amy Mahadi.

Bloomberg TV and Astro's co-operation was dissolved in 2004, and the news programming became known as Berita Astro. Berita Astro ceased production at the end of January 2007 and later launched a new news division, in which Astro Awani was launched in September 2007. Its main news program Awani 7:45 was also simulcasted on this channel every day at 7:45 pm MST. Singtel TV is currently broadcasting this channel on Channel 608 as Singtel TV has been using the 3-digit since the launch of FOX International Channels through Singtel TV.

See also 
 List of Malaysian television stations
 Astro

References

External links 
 Official site
 Astro Ria

Astro Malaysia Holdings television channels
Television channels and stations established in 1996